The bluespotted poacher (Xeneretmus triacanthus) is a fish in the family Agonidae. It was described by Charles Henry Gilbert in 1890, originally in the genus Xenochirus. It is a marine, deep water-dwelling fish which is known from British Columbia, Canada to northern central Baja California, Mexico, in the eastern Pacific Ocean. It dwells at a depth range of 73–373 metres, and inhabits soft benthic sediments. Males can reach a maximum total length of 18 centimetres.

The bluespotted poacher is preyed on by the California sea lion.

References

Bluespotted poacher
Fish described in 1890